West Berkshire Community Hospital is a small hospital located in the Benham Hill area of Shaw-cum-Donnington, in West Berkshire, England. It is managed by Royal Berkshire NHS Foundation Trust.

History
The hospital, established to replace the services previously provided by Newbury and Sandleford hospitals, was officially opened by Princess Anne in October 2004. A new renal and cancer care unit under construction at the hospital is due to be completed later in 2018.

It is to have one of the 40  diagnostic community centres which are intended to expand the range of diagnostic services available outside hospitals.

See also
 List of hospitals in England

References

External links
Official site

Hospital buildings completed in 2004
Hospitals in Berkshire
NHS hospitals in England